Madison Rose Troutt ( Prewett; born March 25, 1996) is an American television personality who came to national prominence in 2020, as the runner-up of season 24 of The Bachelor, starring Peter Weber.

Early life and education 
Troutt was born in Auburn, Alabama to parents Tonya and Chad Prewett. She has two sisters, Mallory and Mary. Her father is the Director of Operations for the Auburn University men's basketball team. She attended Lee-Scott Academy in Auburn, Alabama. She graduated from Auburn University in 2018 with a bachelor of science degree in mass communications and media studies.

Career 
In 2014, she participated in Miss Alabama Teen USA.

Before appearing on The Bachelor, she competed on The Price Is Right in 2019, winning $8,000.

In 2019, she was cast in season 24 of The Bachelor, starring pilot Peter Weber. Filming took place in the fall of 2019. She was officially announced as a contestant on December 16, 2019. In the episode that aired on March 9, 2020, she quit the competition after becoming frustrated with Weber. On After the Final Rose, which aired on March 10, 2020, it is revealed Weber called off his engagement with winner, Hannah Ann Sluss, because he was still in love with Troutt. Troutt and Weber got back together on the show, but they broke up just three days later on March 13, 2020.

She released her book "Made For This Moment" on October 19, 2021.

Personal life 
She got engaged to Grant Troutt, son of Kenny Troutt, on July 31, 2022. They were married on October 29, 2022.

Filmography

Awards and nominations

References

External links

1996 births
Living people
Bachelor Nation contestants